Rhynchophylline is an alkaloid found in certain Uncaria species (Rubiaceae), notably Uncaria rhynchophylla and Uncaria tomentosa.  It also occurs in the leaves of Mitragyna speciosa (kratom), a tree native to Thailand.  Chemically, it is related to the alkaloid mitragynine.

Rhynchophylline is a non-competitive NMDA antagonist (IC50 = 43.2 μM) and a calcium channel blocker.

Uncaria species have had a variety of uses in traditional herbal medicine, such as for lightheadedness, convulsions, numbness, and hypertension.  These uses have been associated with the presence of rhynchophylline and have encouraged its investigation as a drug candidate for several cardiovascular and central nervous system diseases; however, few clinically relevant studies have been conducted.

See also
Ibotenic acid
Mitragynine pseudoindoxyl
Proboscidea parviflora

References

Alkaloids
Calcium channel blockers
NMDA receptor antagonists
Spiro compounds
Methyl esters
Ethers
Lactams